Tropical Storm Zeke was the final named storm of the record-breaking 1992 Pacific hurricane season. Forming out of a tropical wave on October 25, Zeke began as a disorganized depression. Tracking west-northwestward, the system gradually developed organized convection and intensified into a tropical storm. However, it soon entered a high wind shear environment, causing Zeke to weaken to a tropical depression. The following day, the storm re-intensified despite unfavorable conditions and later attained peak winds of 50 mph (85 km/h) on October 29. Rapid weakening followed shortly thereafter as convection dissipated and the center became exposed. During the afternoon of October 30, Zeke degenerated into a remnant low pressure system and dissipated several days later several hundred miles south of Baja California Sur.

On October 29, tropical storm watches and warnings were issued for portions of the Mexican coastline; however, these were canceled the following day due to the storm's rapid weakening. Although the storm did not move over land, its outer bands brought locally heavy rain and gusty winds to Sinaloa and Jalisco.

Meteorological history

Tropical Storm Zeke originated from a tropical wave that was first identified off the west coast of Africa on October 6, 1992. Initially, well-organized convection was associated with the system as it tracked westward; however, once over the Caribbean Sea, shower and thunderstorm activity diminished. Between October 21 and 23, the poorly defined wave moved across Central America and entered the Pacific Ocean. Over the following few days, convection gradually increased and the system became better organized. On October 25, the National Hurricane Center (NHC) to classify it as Tropical Depression Twenty-Seven-E, at which time the storm was situated roughly 805 mi (1,295 km) south of the southern tip of Baja California Sur, Mexico. Upon being classified, the depression was relatively disorganized, but deep convection had maintained itself near the center of circulation.

Throughout October 25, banding features developed and the upper-level outflow became better established. In response to a ridge to the east, the depression tracked in a general west-northwest direction. Intensification was likely as the system was forecast to remain within an environment characterized by low wind shear and warm sea surface temperatures. Later that day, the depression intensified into Tropical Storm Zeke, the record-breaking twenty-fourth named storm of the year. Within several hours of being upgraded, Zeke began to degrade for unknown reasons, with convection lessening around the center. Increasing westerly wind shear, associated with a mid to upper-level trough approaching the west coast of the United States, later caused the system to weaken further; however, Zeke managed to maintain tropical storm intensity until the morning of October 27.

As Zeke continued to be hampered by strong shear, it gradually began to turn towards the north as the trough that caused it to weaken moved further east. Late on October 27, convection redeveloped over the center of circulation, allowing the storm to re-attain tropical storm intensity. The strengthening followed the passage of a shortwave trough; however, shear over the system remained strong. Despite the unfavorable conditions, Zeke maintained its intensity, through intermittent bursts of convection, and began to turn towards the northeast. Late on October 29, a large burst of deep convection over the center of the storm allowed for intensification. Around this time, the storm attained its peak intensity with winds of 50 mph (85 km/h) with a barometric pressure of 1000 mbar (hPa; 29.53 inHg).

Not long after attaining its peak intensity, Zeke began to weaken once more due to increasing westerly wind shear. By the early morning of October 30, the center of circulation became devoid of thunderstorm activity and the system had turned eastward. Later that day, Zeke weakened to a tropical depression before degenerating into a remnant low pressure system. The NHC continued to monitor the low-level swirl of clouds associated with Zeke for several more days as the system meandered several hundred miles south of Baja California Sur.

Preparations, impact and records
On October 29, the forecast track for Zeke produced by the National Hurricane Center indicated that the storm would skirt Baja California before striking the western coast of Mexico as a tropical depression. In response to this, the Government of Mexico issued a tropical storm warning for areas between Cabo San Lázaro and Los Burros. Additionally, a tropical storm watch was raised for areas along mainland Mexico between Los Mochis, Sinaloa and Puerto Vallarta. Roughly 24 hours after these advisories were issued, they were canceled as Zeke rapidly dissipated over open waters. Although the center of the storm never moved over land, the system's outer bands brought locally heavy rain and gusty winds to parts of Sinaloa and Jalisco. When the National Hurricane Center upgraded Tropical Depression Twenty-Seven-E to Tropical Storm Zeke on October 25, it marked the first time that a storm name beginning with the letter "Z" was used on record in the basin. Zeke also continued to further the record of named storms in a single season in the eastern Pacific, being the 24th tropical storm.

See also

Other storms of the same name
1992 Pacific hurricane season

References

External links
The National Hurricane Center's Preliminary Report on Tropical Storm Zeke

1992 Pacific hurricane season
Eastern Pacific tropical storms
Hurricanes in Sinaloa
Hurricanes in Baja California Sur
Hurricanes in Jalisco